Stimmung, for six vocalists and six microphones, is a piece by Karlheinz Stockhausen, written in 1968 and commissioned by the City of Cologne for the Collegium Vocale Köln. Its average length is seventy-four minutes, and it bears the work number 24 in the composer's catalog.

It is a tonal, and yet also a serial composition. It is "the first major Western composition to be based entirely on the production of vocal harmonics", the first "to use overtones as a primary element". An additional innovation is "the unique kind of rhythmic polyphony which arises from the gradual transformation/assimilation of rhythmic models".

Title
The German word Stimmung  has several meanings, including "tuning" and "mood". The word is the noun formed from the verb stimmen, which means "to harmonize, to be correct", and related to Stimme (voice). The primary sense of the title "implies not only the outward tuning of voices or instruments, but also the inward tuning of one's soul". According to the composer, the word

Overview

Stimmung is in just intonation. Six singers amplified by six microphones tune to a low B1 drone, inaudible to the audience, and expand upwards through overtone singing, with that low B's harmonics 2, 3, 4, 5, 7, and 9 (B2, F2, B3, D4, A4, and C5) becoming in turn fundamentals for overtone singing. It is composed using what the composer calls moment form, and consists of 51 sections (called "moments").

The harmonies of Stimmung are composed from 108 pitches: twelve different tones for each of the three women's voices, and twenty-four for each of the three men. Not only do the performers produce partials from the overtone series in each note they sing, but all of the fundamental tones are also related by whole-number overtone ratios. In this way, overtones are composed upon overtones, generating a range of degrees of harmonic fusion.

According to the 1986 Hyperion Singcircle liner notes:

The order of the rhythmic models and the distribution of the poems and "magic names" are decided by the performers, but the sequence of pitches in the 51 moments is fixed. Singcircle performances include the Round House on 21 November 1977, a 1977 BBC Promenade Concert at the Royal Albert Hall, in Liverpool's Anglican Cathedral as part of the 1980 Hope Street Festival, and at the Barbican in 1985, with the composer at the mixing desk. Singcircle's performance at the 2005 City of London Festival was recorded and broadcast on BBC Radio 3's Hear and Now on 20 August 2005. In 2003, Paul Hillier made a "Copenhagen version" for the Theatre of Voices, which he directed. This version, too, has been performed on tour, and a recording has been released on CD. Other groups that have performed Stimmung include the London Sinfonietta Voices, Ensemble Belcanto, Neue Vocalsolisten Stuttgart, the Aquarius Consort, and the Dunedin Consort, according to the performance database of Universal Edition.

Influences and reception
Stockhausen himself attributes a month spent walking among ruins in Mexico as his primary influence, Stimmung recreating that 'magic' space. On the other hand, he also describes the snow on frozen Long Island Sound in February and March 1968 (when he was composing Stimmung in Madison, Connecticut), as "the only landscape I really saw during the composition of the piece". In a letter to Gregory Rose written on 24 July 1982 (printed in the liner notes to Hyperion CDA66115), he describes how, in the small house his wife Mary had rented it was only possible for him to work at night because their two small children needed quiet during the day. He could not sing aloud, as he had done initially, but began to hum quietly, listening to the overtone melodies. Mary reports that Stockhausen first discovered the technique when listening to their small son Simon producing multiple tones while humming in his crib after falling asleep. In this way, Stockhausen became "the first Western composer to use this technique of singing again—in the Middle Ages it had been practised by women and children in churches, but was later entirely supplanted by masculine Gregorian music".

Some writers have seen the possible influence of Stockhausen's student La Monte Young and his mid-1960s drone music with The Theatre of Eternal Music:

However, another precedent for Stimmung is an unfinished work by Stockhausen himself, begun in 1960 and titled Monophonie, which was to have consisted of the single note E. Igor Stravinsky, on the other hand, traces Stimmungs one-note idea back to the pedal point in Henry Purcell's Fantasy upon One Note, and its time-scale to Wagner's Götterdämmerung, while at the same time observing that this time-scale "indicates the need of a musical equivalent to the parking meter".

Stimmung had an enormous impact on many younger composers and has been cited as an important influence on the French spectralists of the 1970s, such as Tristan Murail and Gérard Grisey.

Discography
 Stockhausen: Stimmung (Paris version). Collegium Vocale Köln: Dagmar Apel, Gaby Rodens, Helga Albrecht, Wolfgang Fromme, Georg Steinhoff, Hans-Alderich Billig (recorded 1969). Deutsche Grammophon 2543 003 (LP), and in Avant Garde Vol. 3 DG 2720 025(6LP boxed set).
 Stockhausen: Stimmung (Paris version). Collegium Vocale Köln: Dagmar von Biel, Gaby Ortmann-Rodens, Helga Hamm-Albrecht, Wolfgang Fromme, Helmut Clemens, Hans-Alderich Billig (recorded 1982). In Deutscher Musikrat: Zeitgenössische Musik in der Bundesrepublik Deutschland 7. Harmonia Mundi DMR 1019-21 (3LP boxed set).
The above two recordings together have been rereleased on CD in the Stockhausen Complete Edition CD 12 A-B (2 CDs).
 Stockhausen: Stimmung (Singcircle version). Singcircle: Suzanne Flowers, Penelope Walmsley-Clark, Nancy Long, Rogers Covey-Crump, Gregory Rose, Paul Hillier, directed by Gregory Rose (recorded 1983). Hyperion CDA66115. Awarded the Diapason d'Or.
 Stockhausen: Stimmung (Copenhagen version). Theatre of Voices: Else Torp, Louise Skovbæch, Clara Sanabras, Wolodymyr Smishkewych, Kasper Eliassen, Andrew Hendricks; Ian Dearden, sound diffusion; directed by Paul Hillier (recorded 2006). Harmonia Mundi CD HMU 807408.
 Stockhausen: Stimmung (Paris version, abridged). (Voices of Silicon Valley): Crista Berryessa, Deirdre Lobo, Alexis Lane Jensen, Alexander Frank, Cyril Deaconoff, Matt Dunn. Directed by Cyril Deaconoff (recorded 2018). Orpheus Classical.

References

Cited sources

Further reading

 Adlington, Robert. 2009. "Tuning in and Dropping out: The Disturbance of the Dutch Premiere of Stockhausen's Stimmung". Music & Letters 90, no. 1:94–112.
 Frisius, Rudolf. 2008. Karlheinz Stockhausen II: Die Werke 1950–1977; Gespräch mit Karlheinz Stockhausen, "Es geht aufwärts". Mainz, London, Berlin, Madrid, New York, Paris, Prague, Tokyo, Toronto: Schott Musik International. .
 Giomi, Andrea. 2012. "La voce e la risonanza: Dal grido in una caverna alla performance di Stimmung". De Musica 16:50–98.
 Matheson, Laurie Christine. 1998. "The Self-conscious Ensemble in Selected Twentieth-Century Vocal Works". DMA thesis. Urbana: University of Illinois at Urbana-Champaign.
 Smalley, Roger. 1969. "Reports: Paris". The Musical Times 110, no. 1512 (February): 184.

External links
 Braddell, Rory. STIMMUNG for 6 vocalists (1968)
 Sandow, Greg. 2007. The Magic of Stockhausen's Stimmung". The Wall Street Journal (20 September). 
 Audio extract of performance at British Library, 2007
 
 
 

Compositions by Karlheinz Stockhausen
Compositions in just intonation
Minimalistic compositions
1968 compositions
Serial compositions